In geometry, the elongated triangular pyramid is one of the Johnson solids.  As the name suggests, it can be constructed by elongating a tetrahedron by attaching a triangular prism to its base. Like any elongated pyramid, the resulting solid is topologically (but not geometrically) self-dual.

Formulae
The following formulae for volume and surface area can be used if all faces are regular, with edge length a:

The height is given by 

If the edges are not the same length, use the individual formulae for the tetrahedron and triangular prism separately, and add the results together.

Dual polyhedron 
Topologically, the elongated triangular pyramid is its own dual. Geometrically, the dual has seven irregular faces: one equilateral triangle, three isosceles triangles and three isosceles trapezoids.

Related polyhedra and honeycombs

The elongated triangular pyramid can form a tessellation of space with square pyramids and/or octahedra.

References

External links
 

Johnson solids
Self-dual polyhedra
Pyramids and bipyramids